"Dangerous" is a song by Swedish pop duo Roxette. Written by Per Gessle, the song was released as the fourth and final single from their second studio album, Look Sharp! (1988). Gessle penned it just before Roxette's first tour in 1987. Released in May 1989, it was the group's third top-10 single on the US Billboard Hot 100, reaching number two. It also entered the top 10 in Australia, Canada, and six European countries. The music video was recorded in the ruins of Borgholm Castle. In the UK and Ireland, "Dangerous" was released as a double A-side with "Listen to Your Heart".

Critical reception
Bryan Buss from AllMusic described the song as "A/C-leaning". Bill Coleman from Billboard stated that this "undeniably infectious popper will no doubt keep the super-hot duo in heavy pop radio rotation well into the winter." Pan-European magazine Music & Media viewed the song as "another melodic, radio-friendly effort", that's "already doing well in the US."

Music video
The accompanying music video for "Dangerous" was filmed during Roxette's concert at Borgholm Castle in Öland, Sweden, in July 1989. It is a mix of rehearsal and live performance footage from that show, and was directed by Doug Freel.

Track listings
All songs were written and composed by Per Gessle except "Joy of a Toy", composed by Gessle and Mats Persson.

 7-inch and cassette single (US 50233)
 "Dangerous" (LP version) – 3:50
 "Dangerous" (12-inch version) – 6:26

 7-inch single (Germany 006-1363707 · Australia A-2358)
 "Dangerous" (7-inch version) – 3:46
 "Dangerous"  (Waste of Vinyl 12-inch mix) – 6:26
 "Surrender" (live) – 3:12
 "Joy of a Toy" (live) – 4:10

 7-inch single (Sweden 1363417)
 "Dangerous" (7-inch version) – 3:46
 "Surrender" (live) – 3:12
 "Neverending Love" (live) – 3:20

 US 12-inch single (US V-56159)
 "Dangerous" (Power Mix – long) – 7:02
 "Dangerous" (Power Mix – short) – 3:39
 "Dangerous" (dub) – 3:50
 "I Could Never (Give You Up)" – 3:49

 CD single (Sweden 1363412)
 "Dangerous" (7-inch version) – 3:46
 "Dangerous" (Waste of Vinyl 12-inch mix) – 6:26
 "Surrender" (live) – 3:12
 "Neverending Love" (live) – 3:20
 "Joy of a Toy" (live) – 4:10
 "Sleeping Single" (live) – 4:15

 UK and Ireland CD single (CDEM149)
 "Listen to Your Heart" (Swedish single version) – 5:12
 "Dangerous" – 3:46
 "Listen to Your Heart" (U.S. mix) – 4:53
 "Dangerous" (U.S. club edit) – 3:46

Credits
Credits are adapted from the liner notes of The Rox Box/Roxette 86–06.

Studio
 Recorded in May 1988 at EMI Studios (Stockholm, Sweden)
 Mixed at EMI Studios (Stockholm, Sweden)

Musicians
 Marie Fredriksson – lead and background vocals
 Per Gessle – lead and background vocals, mixing
 Anders Herrlin – background vocals, programming and engineering
 Jonas Isacsson – electric and acoustic guitars
 Henrik Janson – talkbox
 Jarl "Jalle" Lorensson – harmonica
 Clarence Öfwerman – keyboards, programming, production, mixing
 Jan "Janne" Oldaeus – slide guitar
 Alar Suurna – mixing, engineering

Charts

Weekly charts

Year-end charts

Certifications

Release history

References

1988 songs
1989 singles
1990 singles
Cashbox number-one singles
EMI Records singles
Roxette songs
Songs written by Per Gessle